Florian Czarnyszewicz (2 June 1900, Pereseka, near Babrujsk – 18 August 1964, Villa Carlos Paz) was a Belarus-born Polish writer.

Born in a minor local Catholic szlachta family, he participated in the Polish–Soviet War in 1919-1920. As a result of the war, his home region in Eastern Belarus remained under Soviet control as the Belarusian SSR. In 1924, he emigrated to Argentina where he worked in a slaughterhouse in Berisso. He later constructed a house in Villa Carlos Paz. Aerosmith singer Steven Tyler is Florian Czarnyszewicz's great nephew through Florian's brother Feliks.Лідэр Aerosmith і «прынцэса эльфаў» — нашчадкі Флярыяна Чарнышэвіча [Aerosmith frontman and the "elves princess" are descendants of Flaryjan Čarnyševič] - Radio Svaboda, 22 February 2017

Novels
 1942 - Nadberezyńcy (Berezina people)
 1953 - Wicik Żywica
 1958 - Losy pasierbów
 1963 - Chłopcy z Nowoszyszek (Boys from Nowoszyszki)

References

Polish people of the Polish–Soviet War
People from Bobruysky Uyezd
People from Babruysk
1900 births
1964 deaths
People from the Russian Empire of Polish descent
Belarusian people of Polish descent
Polish emigrants to Argentina
Naturalized citizens of Argentina